Joel M. Kleefisch (born June 8, 1971) is a former American politician and a former television reporter who now works as a lobbyist. He served fourteen years in the Wisconsin State Assembly, representing parts of Waukesha, Jefferson, and eastern Dane counties. His wife, Rebecca Kleefisch, is the former Lieutenant Governor of Wisconsin.

Early life and education
Born in Waukesha, Wisconsin, Kleefisch graduated from Waukesha North High School in 1989. He earned a Bachelor of Arts from Pepperdine University in 1993.

Career 
Kleefisch worked as a news researcher for KCBS-TV in Los Angeles during the summer of 1992. Upon graduation from Pepperdine he worked as a reporter for WREX-TV in Rockford, Illinois from 1993 to 1994. Kleefisch then was hired by WISN-TV to work the assignment desk and as a part-time reporter in 1994, before becoming a full-time general assignment reporter, where he worked until entering politics. As a reporter at WISN-TV, he appeared on CNN to discuss the trial of Mark Chmura. He won an award for "Best investigative report or series" from the Milwaukee Press Club in 1999 for a piece about date rape drugs.

Kleefisch was elected to the Wisconsin State Assembly in 2004, and was re-elected in 2006, 2008, 2010, 2012, 2014, and 2016. He represented Oconomowoc and surrounding areas of western Waukesha County, northern Jefferson County, and eastern Dane County. In 2009 he co-sponsored legislation to increase the penalties in Wisconsin for driving under the influence.

Kleefisch did not seek re-election in 2018 and was succeeded by Barbara Dittrich.

Personal life 
Kleefisch met his wife when she was also a reporter and anchor for WISN. They married in 1999 after she moved to the station from Rockford, Illinois. The couple have two children.

References

External links

"Rep. Joel Kleefisch allegedly caught voting for absent member", Feb. 22, 2012

1971 births
Living people
Journalists from Wisconsin
Republican Party members of the Wisconsin State Assembly
People from Oconomowoc, Wisconsin
Politicians from Waukesha, Wisconsin
American evangelicals
Pepperdine University alumni
American television reporters and correspondents
21st-century American politicians